Since 1930, FIFA has sanctioned an official documentary film for each World Cup. Up to 2002, 35 mm film was used for the footage.

List

FIFA Women's World Cup 

In addition to men's World Cup, FIFA has also produced, and published on YouTube, a film about FIFA Women's World Cup, about 2019 FIFA Women's World Cup.

See also 
 Lists of films by studio

References

External links 
 FIFA Films.com
 FIFA Films at Infrontsports.com 

Documentary films about association football
FIFA World Cup-related lists
 
FIFA World Cup